Nadimal Haque (born: 20 September 1969) is a Member of Parliament representing All India Trinamool Congress in the Rajya Sabha from West Bengal. He is Journalist and Writer by profession.

Early life

He did his schooling from Saifee Golden Jubilee English Public School (Saifee Hall) in Kolkata.

He earned the Bachelor of Arts with honors in Political Science at St. Xavier's College, Kolkata under Calcutta University.

Career
He was nominated in the year May 2012 to Rajya Sabha from West Bengal.

Earlier during October 2009 to March 2012 he was Member of the Rajbhasha Committee of Ministry of Railways and during April 2010 to March 2012 he was Member of the Passenger Services Committee of Ministry of Railways. From May 2011 onward he became  Members of various establishments of Government of West Bengal viz Press Accreditation Committee, West Bengal Minority Development & Finance Corporation, Governing Body of Urdu Academy, Mohammedan Burial Board of Kolkata Municipal Corporation, Citizens Committee of Kolkata Police and Nazrul Academy.

From May 2012 onward he is Member of Committee on Urban Development, of Indian Parliament.

References

1969 births
Living people
Trinamool Congress politicians from West Bengal
Rajya Sabha members from West Bengal
Politicians from Kolkata
Journalists from West Bengal
Indian male journalists
St. Xavier's College, Kolkata alumni